Seventy-two amphibian species are found in the American state of Texas, including forty-four species of frog and twenty-eight species of salamander. Four species are categorized as endangered by the International Union for Conservation of Nature:  the Barton Springs salamander, the Texas blind salamander, the black-spotted newt, and the Houston toad. Furthermore, Texas law protects several native amphibians, designating eleven species as threatened within the state and four others as endangered.

The varying geography of Texas, the second-largest state, provides a variety of habitats for amphibians, including swamps and the Piney Woods in the east, rocky hills and limestone karst in the central Hill Country of the Edwards Plateau, desert in the south and west, mountains in the far west (the Trans-Pecos), and grassland prairie in the north, also known as the Panhandle. This vast contrast in biomes makes Texas home to a wide variety of herpetofauna. The state's many rivers, including the Rio Grande, the Colorado River, and the Trinity River, also provide diverse aquatic habitats. Its central position in the United States means that species found primarily in either the western or eastern reaches of the country often have their ranges meeting in the state. Additionally, its proximity to Mexico is such that many species found there and into Central America also range as far north as Texas. Moreover, the karst topography of central Texas has created spring and cave ecosystems inhabited by several endemic species, such as the cave-dwelling Texas blind salamander.

List of species

Order Anura

Family Bufonidae
Bufonidae is a family of toads, often called the "true toads". Although a widely varied family, Bufonidae includes the stereotypical toad: dry warty skin and shortened forelimbs and hindlimbs. Bufonids also carry potent skin toxins, sometimes concentrated in the parotoid gland.

Family Hylidae
Hylidae is a family of frogs which are commonly found in the New World. They may be better known as tree frogs.

Family Leptodactylidae
Leptodactylidae is a family of frogs found only in the New World. Texas encompasses part of their northern-most distribution. Medium to large frogs, they have robust hindlimbs that make them strong jumpers.

Family Microhylidae
Microhylidae is a family of frogs. They can often be identified by their tear-dropped shape, hence the common name "narrow-mouthed frogs".

Family Ranidae
Ranidae, true frogs, are the largest family of frogs. Members of this family, called Ranids, typically have robust hindlimbs, toe webbing, and an aquatic tadpole stage.

Family Rhinophrynidae
Rhinophrynidae are a family of frogs containing only one extant genus, the monotypic Rhinophrynus. Rhinophrynus is a burrowing ant and termite eater, hence the common name "burrowing frog".

Family Scaphiopodidae
Scaphiopodidae are a family of frogs. Commonly called spadefoot frogs, they are often inconspicuously coloured. Members of this family are predominantly fossorial, living underground until rain arrives. To aid in digging, they have keratinized protrusions on their feet.

Order Urodela

Family Amphiumidae
Amphiumidae are a family of salamanders. Members of the family are known as amphiumas. These large salamanders are often mistaken for eels, hence the colloquial name "conger eels". Completely aquatic, these long salamanders can survive droughts by forming a mucous cocoon underground. They can live without food for up to three years and may live for almost 30 years.

Family Salamandridae
Salamandridae are a family of salamanders. Most members, called salamandrids, produce a potent toxin in their skin. Salamandrids typically have patterns of bright and contrasting colors, usually to warn potential predators of their toxicity. They have four well-developed limbs.

Family Ambystomatidae
Ambystomatidae is a family of mostly terrestrial salamanders. Commonly called "mole salamanders", most members of this family live in rodent burrows, only emerging on rainy nights to mate and feed. These relatively large salamanders also typically have mass migrations to mating ponds.

Family Plethodontidae
Plethodontidae are a family of salamanders found mostly in the Western Hemisphere; however, some species are found in Southern Europe and South Korea. They are the largest group of salamanders. Several species of salamanders are endemic to specific cave systems in Texas. Due to their small habitat and specified role, many are threatened or endangered. In 2019, researchers associated with the University of Texas Austin and Texas Parks and Wildlife announced the discovery of an additional three species of spring and cave dwelling salamanders in the Eurycea genus that are yet to be named.

Family Sirenidae
Sirenidae are a family of aquatic salamanders only found in northern Mexico and the Southeastern United States. Family members, called sirens, have very small forelimbs and lack hind limbs altogether. Sirens are generally regarded as the most primitive extant salamanders.

Family Proteidae
Proteidae are a family of aquatic salamanders only found in North America and Europe. Some members are called mudpuppies, waterdogs, or olms. They are paedomorphic and exhibit laterally compressed tail fins and  the red, filamentous external gills. Only one species of Proteidae is found in Texas.

See also

 Geography of Texas
 List of birds of Texas
 List of mammals of Texas
 List of reptiles of Texas

Notes and references

Notes

References

External links
Endangered and Threatened Species found in Texas
References for Amphibian Identification provided by the Texas Parks and Wildlife Department

Amphibians
Texas